is a former Japanese football player.

Club statistics

References

External links

Vissel Kobe

1987 births
Living people
Association football people from Hyōgo Prefecture
Japanese footballers
J1 League players
J2 League players
Japan Football League players
Vissel Kobe players
Gainare Tottori players
FC Osaka players
Association football goalkeepers